Chithariyavar is a 2004 Indian film directed by Lalji George and written by M. K. Harikumar.

The film follows Viswanathan, a youth, who struggles within India's reservation system; instead of desiring to advance through his own merits. It portrays the need for the system of reservation in India for economically weaker communities, and those affected by the Caste System.

The title of the film  means "the shattered", which echoes the protagonist's feelings toward the perceived limitations of the reservation system.

Plot
Viswanathan is a postgraduate youth. His father, Kumaran struggles to earn a living through the traditional chat and Pujas, far removed from his son's educational aspirations. The reservation system in India guarantees positions to historically disadvantaged groups. When offered a position based on his poor background rather than his abilities, Viswanathan refuses. He struggles to rectify his own belief in his abilities with the seemingly meritless position offered; a struggle that worsens his feelings of inadequacy. The film explores the differences between the traditional work of the father and the educational job sought by the son, and merit-based advancement versus affirmative action.

Production 
Chithariyavar was filmed in Shornur Koonathura.

Cast and crew
 Sreenivasan as Viswanathan
 Mundoor Krishnankutty as Kumaran
 Maya Maushmi as Reshma

Music
Kureepuzha's poem Keezhalar is used as background score in the movie. The music is done by an Indian film-score composer and music director, Johnson. The folk songs in the movie are done by C. J. Kuttappan.

References

Dalit culture
Works about reservation in India
Films about the caste system in India
2000s Malayalam-language films